Garraf may refer to:
Garraf Massif, a mountain system in Barcelona province
 El Garraf, a comarca (county) in Barcelona province
Parc Natural del Garraf, a natural park in the Garraf Massif
Garraf (Sitges), a seaside village between Sitges and Castelldefels
Port del Garraf, a marina in the coastal Garraf area
Les Costes del Garraf, Carretera C-31 road 
Complot de Garraf an attempt to kill king Alfonso XIII of Spain in May 1925